Childless Hundred Days (百日无孩) is a campaign of mass forced abortions in Shen County and Guan County in Shandong, China. The campaign started on 1 May 1991 and ended on 10 August 1991. It was designed to reduce local population growth, under the national One-child policy. The campaign was initiated by the local Party Committee Secretary Zeng Zhaoqi (曾昭起) and Bai Zhigang (白志刚).

During the campaign, local officials were asked to perform forced abortions on any pregnant woman in these areas regardless of pregnancy terms or whether the unborn child is the first child of the family. The policy led to mass panic and dramatic reduction of the local population in 1991.

References 

One-child policy
Birth control in China
Human overpopulation
Political controversies in China
Forced abortion